Karangetang (also known as Api Siau) is a volcano on the north side of Siau Island off the coast of Sulawesi, Indonesia. The island is inhabited by 22,000 people. It is one of the most active volcanoes in Indonesia having erupted 41 times since 1675. A pyroclastic flow in 1997 killed three people.

Current activity
In August 2007 an eruptive episode forced evacuations from nearby areas.

On 9 June 2009 the Volcanological Survey of Indonesia raised the eruption alert status of Karangetang to Level Orange.

On 6 August 2010 Karangetang again erupted, spewing lava and ash hundreds of meters into the air. Four villagers are missing.

On 11 March 2011, a few hours after an earthquake in Japan caused a Pacific-wide tsunami, Mount Karangetang again erupted. There were no reports of serious damage or deaths, though lava and hot gas clouds were emitted onto its slopes.

On September 2, 2013, the volcano began erupting again.

There was another spell of activity from November 2018 onwards, and yet others between 2013 and that. On 20 July 2019 a new eruption started, continuing as of October 2019. This was accompanied by effusion of lava.

See also 
Temboko Lehi Beach
 List of volcanoes in Indonesia
 List of Ultras of Malay Archipelago
 Volcanological Survey of Indonesia
 2010 eruptions of Mount Merapi

Footnotes

References

External links
 Volcanological Survey of Indonesia
 "Karangetang, Indonesia" on Peakbagger

Stratovolcanoes of Indonesia
Mountains of Indonesia
Landforms of the Celebes Sea
Active volcanoes of Indonesia
Holocene stratovolcanoes